Arild Gilbert Sundgot (born 17 April 1978 in Ulsteinvik) is a former Norwegian football striker, who played most of his career for Lillestrøm.

He is the younger brother of Ole Bjørn Sundgot, and the son of Otto Sundgot. He was capped several times on youth and under-21 level. He started playing for Lillestrøm in 1997, when he was brought from Hødd by Even Pellerud, the Lillestrøm manager at that time. He is considered one of the best players in the history of LSK, having scored more than 100 league goals during his 15 years tenure at the club.

In the summer of 2012 Sundgot started a tenure as coach in Lillestrøm. He eventually became assistant manager under Arne Erlandsen. In December 2016 he was announced as the new assistant manager of Hødd. However, he was not able to harmonize the job situation with his family, and thus resigned and promptly signed a new two-year contract in Lillestrøm.

Residing in Jessheim since the mid-2010s, he was hired as assistant manager of local second-tier club Ull/Kisa ahead of the 2021 season. In the summer of 2021 he was promoted to manager, on a contract spanning the rest of 2021. He was sacked on 3 October.

References

External links 
 

1978 births
Living people
People from Ulstein
Norwegian footballers
Norway youth international footballers
Norway under-21 international footballers
Norwegian First Division players
Eliteserien players
IL Hødd players
Lillestrøm SK players
Association football forwards
Norwegian football managers
Lillestrøm SK non-playing staff
Ullensaker/Kisa IL managers
Sportspeople from Møre og Romsdal